Highway 80 is a highway in the Canadian province of Saskatchewan. It runs from Highway 22 near Esterhazy to Highway 8/Highway 10 near Wroxton.

Highway 80 also passes near the communities of Yarbo and Churchbridge. It intersects Highway 16, Highway 725, and Highway 381.

Major Intersections 
From south to north:

References

080